Vāsanā (Sanskrit; Devanagari: वासना) is a behavioural tendency or karmic imprint which influences the present behaviour of a person. It is a technical term in Indian philosophy, particularly Yoga, as well as Buddhist philosophy and Advaita Vedanta.

Nomenclature, orthography and etymology
Vāsanā (Devanagari: वासना) and its near homonym vasana (Devanagari: वसन) are from the same Indo-European linguistic root, sharing a common theme of 'dwelling' or 'abiding'.

 Vāsanā (Devanagari: वासना): 
 Past impressions, impressions formed, the present consciousness of past (life) perceptions; 
 The impression of anything in the mind, the present consciousness formed from past perceptions, knowledge derived from memory, the impressions remaining in the mind; 
 Thinking of, longing for, expectation, desire, inclination.
 Vasana (Devanagari: वसन): cloth, clothes, dress, garment, apparel, attire, dwelling or abiding.

Buddhism

Keown (2004) defines the term generally within Buddhism as follows:
"vāsanā (Skt.). Habitual tendencies or dispositions, a term, often used synonymously with bīja (‘seed’). It is found in Pāli and early Sanskrit sources but comes to prominence with the Yogācāra, for whom it denotes the latent energy resulting from actions which are thought to become ‘imprinted’ in the subject's storehouse-consciousness (ālaya-vijñāna). The accumulation of these habitual tendencies is believed to predispose one to particular patterns of behaviour in the future."

Sandvik (2007: unpaginated) states that:

Cheng Weishi Lun
Lusthaus states that the Cheng Weishi Lun (Chinese: 成唯識論), a commentary on Vasubandhu's Triṃśikā-vijñaptimātratā, lists three types of vāsanā, which are synonymous with 'bija' or 'seeds':
 Vāsanā of 'names and words' or 'terms and words (Chinese: ming-yen hsi-chi'i) which equates to 'latent linguistic conditioning'. These seeds, planted in the 'root consciousness' (Sanskrit: alaya-vijnana) by 'terms and words' are the 'causes' (Sanskrit: hetu) and 'conditions' (Sanskrit: pratyaya) of each 'conditioned or caused element or phenomena' (Sanskrit: samskrita dharma). There are two forms: 
 'Terms and words indicating a referent' (Chinese: piao-yi ming yen) through which a mindstream is able to express (Chinese: ch'uan) meanings (yi, artha, referent) by differentiation of vocal sounds (Chinese: yin-sheng ch'a-pieh); and 
 'Terms and words revealing perceptual-fields' (Chinese: hsien-ching ming wen), through which a mindstream discerns (Sanskrit: vijnapti, upalabdhi) perceptual-fields (Sanskrit: visaya) as ' phenomena of mind' (Sanskrit: citta dharma; caitta dharmas). 
 Vasanas of self-attachment (Sanskrit: atma-graha-vasana; Chinese: wo-chih hsi-ch'i) denoting the false attachment to the seeds of 'me' and 'mine'.
 Vasanas which link streams-of-being (Sanskrit: bhavanga-vasana; Chinese: yu-chih hsi-ch'i) denoting the karmic seeds, 'differently maturing (Sanskrit: vipaka) that carry over (Chinese: chao) from one stream-of-being to another in the Three Worlds (Sanskrit: Triloka). The bhavanga (linkage from one stream-of-being to the next) is of two types: 
 Contaminated yet advantageous (Sanskrit: sasrava-kusala; Chinese: yu-lou shan) that is actions (Sanskrit: karma) which produce desirable (Chinese: k'e-ai) fruits; and 
 Disadvantageous, that is actions which produce undesirable fruits.

Bon & Dzogchen

Bag chags are important in Bonpo soteriology, especially the view of the Bonpo Dzogchenpa, where it is fundamentally related to the key doctrines of 'Primordial Purity' (
 
As Karmay  relates in his English rendering of the Bonpo text 'Kunzi Zalshay Selwai Gronma' from the Tibetan:

Hinduism

Vaishanavism

Śrīmad Bhāgavatam (5.11.5) (also known as the Bhagavata Purana), a principal text for the Vaishnava tradition of Sanatana Dharma employs the term 'vasana':

A satisfactory English rendering has not yet been sourced, but the import is that the 'imprinted-volitions-of-mind' (vāsanātmā), whether pious or impious, are conditioned by the Gunas. The gunas propel the mind into different 'formations' (rūpa-bhedam). The 'mind' (atma) is the master of the sixteen material elements. Its 'refined or coarse quality' (antaḥ-bahiṣṭvam) determines the mind-formations of manifestation (tanoti).

Advaita Vedanta

A vasana literally means 'wishing' or 'desiring',  but is used in Advaita in the sense of the sub-conscious or latent tendencies in one’s nature.

Writing from an Advaita Vedanta perspective, Waite refers to a model offered by Edward de Bono:

Notes

References

Advaita Vedanta
Habits
Sanskrit words and phrases
Theravada